Casey Brixton Weathers (born June 10, 1985) is an American professional baseball coach and former pitcher. He was drafted 8th overall in the 2007 Major League Baseball Draft by the Colorado Rockies. He played in college for the Vanderbilt Commodores.

Biography
Weathers attended Laguna Creek High School in Elk Grove, California, and then Sacramento City College where he played in the outfield. During one practice, Weathers claimed he could throw harder than teammate Adam Eisner. This ongoing banter led to Weathers lighting up the radar gun for fun. Despite his wanting to remain an outfielder, once he hit 94 MPH on the gun, he was eventually converted to a pitcher by the coaching staff. Weathers was also teammates with Stephen Bautista, Brian Smith, Shaun Stinson, and Cincinnati Reds pitcher David Hernandez on the semi-pro Elk Grove Leprechauns where he led the league in home runs.

After two years at Sacramento City College, Weathers transferred to Vanderbilt University. After his first year at Vanderbilt, Weathers participated in the Alaskan Summer League and was a late addition to the Team USA roster where he joined manager Tim Corbin and teammates David Price and Pedro Alvarez. Weathers enjoyed a successful senior season at Vanderbilt where he led the team in saves and tied for the team lead in wins. He was named a First Team All American and a finalist for National Stopper of the Year.

Professional career

Colorado Rockies
Weathers was drafted by the Colorado Rockies with the 8th overall pick of the 2007 amateur draft and signed a contract on June 18, 2007, with a $1.8 million signing bonus.

On October 31, 2008, Weathers underwent Tommy John surgery to repair his pitching elbow.  He was added to the Rockies' 40 man roster after the 2010 season.

Chicago Cubs
On December 8, 2011, Weathers was traded along with Ian Stewart to the Chicago Cubs for Tyler Colvin and DJ LeMahieu.

On March 13, 2012, Weathers was outrighted to the minor leagues and opened the 2012 season with the AA Tennessee Smokies.

San Francisco Giants
Weathers signed a minor league deal with the San Francisco Giants in December 2013. He was released in March 2014.

Tampa Bay Rays
On May 26, 2014, Weathers signed a minor league deal with the Tampa Bay Rays.

Cleveland Indians
On December 31, 2014, Weathers signed a minor league deal with the Cleveland Indians.

Fargo-Moorhead RedHawks
On April 20, 2017, Weathers signed with the Fargo-Moorhead RedHawks of the American Association of Independent Professional Baseball. He was released on December 15, 2017.

Coaching career
Weathers was hired prior to the 2020 season by the Cincinnati Reds as a rehabilitation coach and Arizona League pitching coach. As of 2022, he is the pitching coach of the Triple-A Louisville Bats.

International career
Weathers pitched for the United States national baseball team in the 2008 Summer Olympics, winning the Bronze medal.  He pitched in three games, recording a save in Match #28 against Japan.

Awards and honors
 2007 Baseball America First Team All American 
 2007 Collegiate Baseball First Team All American 
 2007 American Baseball Coaches Association First Team All American 
 2007 National Collegiate Baseball Writers Association Third Team All American
 2007 First Team All SEC

Scouting report
Weathers has two power offerings and durability, as evidenced by back-to-back outings over an early February 2007 weekend.

References

External links

Vanderbilt Commodores bio

1985 births
Living people
Baseball coaches from California
Baseball players from California
Asheville Tourists players
Modesto Nuts players
Tulsa Drillers players
Tri-City Dust Devils players
Tennessee Smokies players
Charlotte Stone Crabs players
Lynchburg Hillcats players
Akron RubberDucks players
Vanderbilt Commodores baseball players
Sacramento City Panthers baseball players
Baseball players at the 2008 Summer Olympics
Olympic bronze medalists for the United States in baseball
Sportspeople from Elk Grove, California
Medalists at the 2008 Summer Olympics
Minor league baseball players
Minor league baseball coaches
All-American college baseball players